"Odd Look" is a song recorded by French electronic musician Kavinsky featuring fellow French disk jockey SebastiAn from his album OutRun (2013). The song was co-written by the two artists and produced by the latter. It was released as a single on 6 June 2013.

Commercial performance
The single was a moderate hit in France, where it charted on the SNEP charts and reached a peak position of number 46.

Music video
The music video for "Odd Look" premiered on 6 August 2013 on Kavinsky's Vevo account on YouTube.

Usage in media
A snippet of the song was used in a 2012 French commercial for BMW i, which was shown in cinemas.

Track listing
"Odd Look"  – 4:12
"Odd Look"  – 4:21
"Odd Look"  – 4:02
"Odd Look"  – 5:17
"Odd Look"  – 5:08
"Odd Look"  – 4:50

Charts

The Weeknd remix

An official remix of the song featuring Canadian singer the Weeknd from the Kavinsky's Odd Look EP (2013) was released as a single on 24 July 2013. The Weeknd later included the remix on the iTunes edition of his debut studio album Kiss Land (2013).

Commercial performance
The remixed single was a moderate hit in Belgium, where it charted on the Ultratop 50 Singles charts of both Flanders and Wallonia. Where it peaked at number 18 and 34 respectively. The song was also a minor success in the United States where it peaked at number 46 on the Billboard Dance/Electronic Songs chart.

Charts

Year-end charts

References

External links
 

2013 singles
The Weeknd songs
Songs written by the Weeknd
Songs written by Belly (rapper)